The SR-2 "Veresk" (English: Heather) is a Russian submachine gun designed to fire the 9×21mm Gyurza pistol cartridge.

History
Development of a new submachine gun chambered for the 9×21mm Gyurza cartridge (also used by the SR-1 "Vektor" pistol) was launched in the mid-1990s on the request of Russia's Federal Security Service (FSB). A weapon was presented in 1999, developed by TsNIITochMash in Klimovsk, which received the designation of SR-2 (English: Special Development 2) and nicknamed "Veresk" ("Heather").

"Veresk" and its round were created as a compact weapon capable of engaging enemies wearing Russian class-II body armor (able to stop ordinary pistol bullets, such as 9×19mm Parabellum and 7.62×25mm Tokarev), and soft-skinned vehicles, at distances up to 200 metres.

Features

The SR-2 "Veresk" differs from most submachine guns by its gas-operated action with rotating bolt, typically used in assault rifles (normally SMGs utilise different blowback principles). This design is partially borrowed from the SR-3 "Vikhr" compact assault rifle. Externally the "Veresk" is similar to the Uzi; 20- or 30-round magazines are inserted into the pistol grip. There are two AK-style control levers on both sides of the receiver:  the right one is the safety switch, the left is a fire-mode selector. The cocking handle is on the right side and is fixed to the bolt carrier, so it moves during firing. There is a mount for a "red dot" sight on top of the receiver (unlike the AK-style side rail). The weapon has an upwards-folding metal stock.

The SR-2M is a modified version that also has a forward pistol grip under the handguard, with a protrusion to protect the shooter's hand from muzzle blast and accidents (similar to the grip on the MP5K). Its stock can be fully folded even with "red dot" sight installed.

The SR-2MP further modernisation upgrade that features Picatinny rails on each side of the handguard and a sound suppressor.

See also

 List of Russian weaponry

External links 
 SR-2 "Veresk" on Modern Firearms
 Gewehr.ru:"Вереск" (СР-2, СР-2M)
 Handgun:Пистолет-пулемёт "Вереск" (СР-2, СР-2М)

Notes

Personal defense weapons
Submachine guns of Russia
TsNIITochMash products
Weapons and ammunition introduced in 1999